Valeri Nikolayevich Filatov (born 18 November 1950) is a Russian football administrator and former player and manager.

He was the president of FC Lokomotiv Moscow from 1992 to 2006, under his leadership and the management of Yuri Semin Lokomotiv won their two Russian Professional Football League titles in 2002 and 2004.

Honours as a player
 Soviet Top League champion: 1976 (autumn).
 Soviet Top League runner-up: 1980.

External links
 

1950 births
Sportspeople from Ashgabat
Living people
Soviet footballers
Soviet Top League players
FC SKA Rostov-on-Don players
FC Torpedo Moscow players
FC Spartak Moscow players
Soviet football managers
FC Lokomotiv Moscow managers
Association football midfielders